"Flamethrower" is a song by the J. Geils Band released in 1982 as the B-side to the single "Freeze Frame", from the album of the same name.

Reception
"Flamethrower" received airplay on urban contemporary radio, notably in Metro Detroit, and reached number 25 on the Billboard soul chart.  The song also received airplay on rock and Top 40 stations.  AllMusic critic Stephen Thomas Erlewine praised the song's hard-boogie riff. Record World described the song as "black radio."

Chart positions

References

1981 songs
Songs written by Seth Justman
The J. Geils Band songs